The Pillsbury Mountain Forest Fire Observation Station is a historic fire observation station located on Pillsbury Mountain summit at Arietta in Hamilton County, New York. The tower was built in 1924 by the Aermotor Windmill Company and the associated observer's cabin and shed in 1950. The lookout tower measures 69 feet tall.

It was added to the National Register of Historic Places in 2010.

References

External links

The Fire Towers of New York

Government buildings on the National Register of Historic Places in New York (state)
Buildings and structures in Hamilton County, New York
Fire lookout towers in Adirondack Park
Fire lookout towers on the National Register of Historic Places in New York (state)
National Register of Historic Places in Hamilton County, New York